Can't Complain is a 2009 American independent comedy film written and produced by Corey Williams. This was director Richard Johnson second feature length narrative film.

Plot
When Kevin finds out that his sisters friend is rich due to having a baby with a professional basketball player, he and his roommate set their sights on getting female athletes pregnant and taking them to court for child support.

Cast
 Gary-Kayi Fletcher as Kevin Grant
 Mia Barnes as Kristen Matthews
 Gabe Baez as Orlando (O) Sanchez
 Ayanna Dookie as Shonda Williams
 Jace Nicole - Kim Johnson
 Tony Folden as Sammy
 Tyeisha Gibson as Carla Grant
 Trinetta Wright as Maria
 Paul Wiedecker as Attorney
 Beth Sopel as Sue Marshall
 Marat Mosotovoy as Producer
 Alexis Monet as Shannon
 Tiphany Johnson as Coach Kerns
 Dawn Hoff - Jen Rivers
 Douglas Farley - Dick Jenkins
 Tony Fleming - Damien Lang

Production
The film was shot in 49 days in Baltimore and Joppa, Maryland. Producer Corey Williams and Director Richard Johnson cast the film. Comedian Ayanna Dookie's comedy standup scenes were filmed first.

Release
Can't Complain was released on DVD and Video on Demand on June 20, 2010.

External links
 
 Can't Complain stills from GoldenTiger Productions
 2010 Filmmaker Spotlight Award at the TOMI Film Festival
 Shot in Harford from ExploreHarford.com
 From Harford to the Movies from ExploreHarford.com

2009 films
American independent films
2009 comedy films
American comedy films
2009 independent films
2000s English-language films
2000s American films